Giovanni Colonna or John Colonna may refer to:

 Giovanni Colonna (died 1245) (1170–1245), cardinal of the Roman Catholic Church
 Giovanni Colonna (archbishop) (1205–1263), archbishop of Messina
 Giovanni Colonna (historian) (1298–1343/44), Dominican and writer, friend of Petrarch
 Giovanni Colonna (cardinal, 1295–1348) (1295–1348), Roman Catholic cardinal
 Giovanni Colonna (cardinal, 1456–1508) (1456–1508), Roman Catholic cardinal
 Giovanni Paolo Colonna (c. 1637–1695), Italian musician and composer
 Giovanni Colonna (archaeologist) (born 1934), Italian scholar of ancient Italy
 John Colonna (born 1962), Puerto Rican child who disappeared along with his sister Gianinna